Rayaprolu is a village in Kakumanu mandal, located in Guntur district of Andhra Pradesh, India.

References

Villages in Guntur district